Groma, also known as Tromowa and J'umowa, is a language spoken primarily in the lower Chumbi Valley in Tibet, with some speakers in Sikkim in India. It belongs to the southern group of Tibetan languages. Its speakers identify as Tibetans.

References

Further reading
 

Languages of Bhutan
Languages of China
Languages of India
South Bodish languages